Trio Music is an album by Chick Corea, released in 1982 through the record label ECM. It features bassist Miroslav Vitous, and drummer Roy Haynes. The album peaked at number seventeen on Billboard Jazz Albums chart. The record is this trio’s successor to the 1968 classic Now He Sings, Now He Sobs and the precursor of their 1986 Trio Music, Live in Europe.
<p>The double album releases (on LP and CD) name the first record/disc "Trio Improvisations" and the second record/disc “The Music of Thelonious Monk." (The album was also issued as single CD edition.)

Track listing 
“Trio Improvisations”
 "Trio Improvisation 1" (Chick Corea, Roy Haynes, Miroslav Vitouš) – 3:26
 "Trio Improvisation 2" (Corea, Haynes, Vitouš) – 3:51
 "Trio Improvisation 3" (Corea, Haynes, Vitouš) – 3:08
 "Duet Improvisation 1" (Corea, Vitouš) – 4:26
 "Duet Improvisation 2" (Corea, Vitouš) – 5:26
 "Trio Improvisation 4" (Corea, Haynes, Vitouš) – 4:40
 "Trio Improvisation 5" (Corea, Haynes, Vitouš) – 7:43
 "Slippery When Wet" (Corea) – 6:01
“The Music of Thelonious Monk”
 "Rhythm-A-Ning" (Thelonious Monk) – 5:06
 "'Round Midnight" (Bernie Hanighen, Monk, Cootie Williams) – 5:15
 "Eronel" (Monk) – 4:38
 "Think of One" (Monk) – 4:28
 "Little Rootie Tootie" (Monk) – 4:50
 "Reflections" (Monk) – 6:47
 "Hackensack" (Monk) – 6:13

Personnel
 Chick Corea – piano
 Miroslav Vitouš – bass
 Roy Haynes – drums
 Manfred Eicher: Producer
 Martin Wieland: Engineer, mixing engineer

Chart performance

References

External links 
 Chick Corea, Miroslav Vitous, Roy Haynes - Trio Music (1982) album at ECMRecords.com
 Chick Corea, Miroslav Vitous, Roy Haynes - Trio Music (1982) album review by Scott Yanow, credits & releases at AllMusic
 Chick Corea, Miroslav Vitous, Roy Haynes - Trio Music (1982) album releases & credits at Discogs
 Chick Corea, Miroslav Vitous, Roy Haynes - Trio Music (1982) album to be listened as stream on Spotify

1982 albums
Albums produced by Manfred Eicher
Chick Corea albums
ECM Records albums